Jennifer Hyman is the CEO and co-founder of Rent the Runway, a company focused on the renting of high-end clothing and accessories.

Early life and education
Jennifer Hyman grew up in New Rochelle, New York, and attended New Rochelle High School. She received her BA in social sciences from Harvard University in 2002.

She later attended Harvard Business School, where she met co-founder of Rent the Runway Jennifer Fleiss, and graduated with an MBA in 2009.

Career
In November 2008, Hyman first had the idea for Rent the Runway after witnessing her sister agonize over and drop thousands of dollars on a dress for a wedding, only to wear it once.  Hyman says; "I realized what she cared about was the experience of walking into a room and feeling like the best version of herself—she didn’t actually care about the ownership of the dress."  Hyman co-founded Rent the Runway in 2009.

A highlight in Hyman's career was taking the company public as the 30th women ever to take her company public in history, and being a part of the first company to go public with a female founder/CEO, COO, and CFO. 

Hyman participates in national conferences and panel discussions regarding topics covering the economy, women in business and company culture. Some of her past speaking engagements include NRF Foundation's "Retail’s Big Show" WWD's Digital Forum and the 99U Conference.

Hyman has spoken out publicly against sexual harassment in the tech industry and went public with her own experience on CNBC's Squawk Alley in July 2017.

In May 2018, Hyman published a New York Times op-ed titled "Treating Workers Fairly at Rent the Runway," in which she announced that the company would equalize benefits across its salaried and hourly employees. RTR team members in the company's warehouse and stores and on its customer service team receive the same parental leave, family sick leave, bereavement leave and sabbatical packages as the company's corporate employees.

Hyman serves on the Board of Directors of the Estée Lauder Companies, and on the Women.nyc Advisory Board.

Honors
Hyman was listed in Fortune magazine's 40 Under 40 in 2012. Hyman was named one of Time magazine's 100 Most Influential People of 2019.

References

External links
 
 Jennifer Hyman and Jennifer Fleiss, Founders of Rent the Runway on Maria Shriver's website
 Mystery Guest: `Rent The Runway' CEO Jennifer Hyman on Bloomberg TV
 How I Built This - Rent the Runway: Jenn Hyman (NPR podcast)

Businesspeople from New York City
American fashion businesspeople
American women chief executives
American technology chief executives
Businesspeople from New Rochelle, New York
Harvard Business School alumni
People from Greenwich Village
American women company founders
American company founders
Living people
21st-century American women
1980 births
New Rochelle High School alumni